The Czechoslovakia men's national field hockey team represented Czechoslovakia in men's international field hockey.

The team participated in three European Championships. Its best result was at the 1974 edition when it finished ninth.

Tournament record

European Championship
1970 – 10th place
1974 – 9th place
1978 – 10th place

See also
Czech Republic men's national field hockey team
Czechoslovakia women's national field hockey team
Slovakia men's national field hockey team

References

Field hockey
Former national field hockey teams
National team
European men's national field hockey teams